Delpydora is a genus of plant in the family Sapotaceae described as a genus in 1897 .

The genus is native to western and central Africa.

Species
 Delpydora gracilis A.Chev. - Ivory Coast, Ghana, Liberia, Gabon
 Delpydora macrophylla Pierre - Cameroon, Gabon, Congo Republic

References

Sapotaceae genera
Chrysophylloideae